Edwin Bennett may refer to:

 Edwin Bennett (cricketer) (1893–1929), English cricketer
 Edwin Keppel Bennett (1887–1958), English writer, poet, Germanist and academic
 Edwin Bennett (potter) (1818–1908), English American pioneer of the pottery industry and art in the United States